Château Langoa-Barton (archaically named Pontet Langlois) is a winery in the Saint-Julien appellation of the Bordeaux region of France.   Château Langoa-Barton is also the name of the red wine produced by this property.  The wine produced here was classified as one of fourteen Troisièmes Crus (Third Growths) in the historic Bordeaux Wine Official Classification of 1855.

History
Château Langoa-Barton was purchased in 1821 by the Anglo-Irishman Hugh Barton, a brother of General Charles Barton, and has remained in the Barton family since then. In 1983, Anthony Barton took over the ownership and administration of the estate.

Production
Located in the center of the appellation along the banks of the Gironde river, Langoa-Barton has roughly  under vine.  The plantings are divided as follows: 70% Cabernet Sauvignon, 20% Merlot, 8% Cabernet Franc, and 2% Petit Verdot.  Typical of the area, the soil composition of the vineyard is composed of a gravel topsoil over a clay sub-stratum.

Château Langoa-Barton shares its cellar with its sibling Château Léoville-Barton, and though the red wines share similar upbringing in the cellar, Langoa-Barton generally ends up as the lighter style of the two.  About 7,000 cases of Château Langoa-Barton are produced in an average vintage.

References

External links
 Château Léoville-Barton official site

Bordeaux wine producers